Ulf Oscar Sand (22 May 1938 – 29 December 2014) was a Norwegian civil servant and politician for the Labour Party.

He was born in Bærum. He graduated as cand.oecon. from the University of Oslo in 1963. He worked as a civil servant in the Ministry of Finance from 1964, and then in the Norwegian Confederation of Trade Unions from 1966 to 1971.

From 1971 to 1972, in the first cabinet Bratteli, Sand was appointed state secretary in the Ministry of Pay and Prices and the Ministry of Consumer Affairs and Administration. He lost his job when the first cabinet Bratteli fell in 1972, but from 1973 to 1977 he returned as state secretary as part of the second cabinet Bratteli.

As an elected politician he was a member of the executive committee of Bærum municipal council from 1967 to 1971.

Sand returned to the Norwegian Confederation of Trade Unions as chief economist from 1977 to 1983. He returned to national politics in 1979, when he was appointed Minister of Finance in the cabinet Nordli. He retained his job when the cabinet Nordli was followed by the first cabinet Brundtland in 1981. However, this cabinet only lasted until October 1981, following the 1981 Norwegian parliamentary election.

Sand continued his career as director of the Norwegian State Educational Loan Fund from 1983 to 1986. From 1986 to his retirement in 2003 he was permanent under-secretary of State (departementsråd) in the Ministry of Local Government and Regional Development.

References

1938 births
2014 deaths
Labour Party (Norway) politicians
Ministers of Finance of Norway
Norwegian state secretaries
Bærum politicians
Directors of government agencies of Norway
Norwegian civil servants
University of Oslo alumni